Hāmiora Mangakāhia (1838 – 4 June 1918) was a prominent Māori chief and the first Premier of Te Kotahitanga, the movement for an independent Māori parliament in New Zealand in the 1890s. Of Ngati Whanaunga descent, Mangakāhia was born in Waikaurau on the Coromandel Peninsula. In 1892 he was one of 19 chiefs elected to represent Te Tai Hauāuru in the Lower House of Te Kotahitanga at its first sitting at Waipatu Marae. As a leading organiser of the movement, he was nominated by fellow chiefs Henare Tomoana and Te Keepa Te Rangihiwinui to the position of Premier, which he held for the duration of the 1892 sitting of the parliament.

In 1881, he came a distant second of four candidates, trailing Wiremu Te Wheoro by over 53% of the vote. In 1884, of eight candidates, he came seventh with 8.85% of the vote. Mangakāhia was also a frequent appellant to the Native Affairs Committee.

He was married to Meri Te Tai Mangakāhia, a leading figure in the movement for Women's suffrage in New Zealand. One of his daughters, Mabel Mangakāhia, was a notable nurse.

References

1838 births
1918 deaths
Māori politicians
Ngāti Whanaunga people
People from Coromandel Peninsula
Unsuccessful candidates in the 1881 New Zealand general election
Unsuccessful candidates in the 1884 New Zealand general election
Unsuccessful candidates in the 1902 New Zealand general election